The Zeppelin-Lindau CL.II was a German single-engine two-seat biplane with an all metal structure, built by Zeppelin-Lindau during World War I.

Design
The CL.I was an all-metal single-bay wire-braced biplane, with a stressed skin fuselage, and fabric covered flying surfaces and represented an intermediate step which would lead to the similar but smaller and more refined D.I.

Development
The radiator in the CL.I had been located between the wing spars in the upper wing, offset to the pilot's right, however as the plumbing obstructed the pilot's view, and the radiator reduced the efficiency of the wings, it was relocated to the nose of the aircraft.

With the Zeppelin-Lindau CS.I monoplane and Zeppelin-Lindau D.I showing more promise, development of the CL.II was abandoned and the last test flight was made on 14 September 1918.

Specifications

Notes

References

Citations

Bibliography

1910s German aircraft
Biplanes
Aircraft first flown in 1918